The smalleye shiner (Notropis buccula) is a species of ray-finned fish in the family Cyprinidae (carps and minnows). It is found only in the upper Brazos River basin of Texas, which includes the Double Mountain and Salt forks of the upper Brazos. It became a candidate for federal listing as an endangered species of the United States in 2013.

See also
Double Mountain Fork Brazos River
North Fork Double Mountain Fork Brazos River
Salt Fork Brazos River
Sharpnose shiner

References

Further reading
 Robert Jay Goldstein, Rodney W. Harper, Richard Edwards: American Aquarium Fishes. Texas A&M University Press 2000, p. 86
 

Notropis
Fish described in 1953
Taxonomy articles created by Polbot
ESA endangered species